Gloryhammer is a British  power metal band founded by keyboardist Christopher Bowes, lead vocalist of the band Alestorm. Each member of the band represents a character in the story concept. The band appears on-stage in armour and costumes to represent their respective characters.

History
Gloryhammer released their debut album Tales from the Kingdom of Fife through Napalm Records on 29 March, 2013. Prior to the release of the album, the single "Angus McFife" was released through the Napalm's YouTube channel on 7 March 2013. 

The band released videos on Napalm's channel for "Universe on Fire" on 8 August 2015 and "Rise of The Chaos Wizards" on 11 September 2015. On the 25 September, 2015, Gloryhammer released their second studio album titled Space 1992: Rise of the Chaos Wizards with which the band entered the official album charts in several countries, followed by tours with bands such as Stratovarius, Blind Guardian and HammerFall.

On 16 May 2017, Gloryhammer was nominated as best band in the category "Up & Coming" of the Metal Hammer Awards 2017 by the German edition of international music magazine Metal Hammer. In 2018, the band was nominated again in the same category.

In January 2018, the band did a headlining tour across Europe, consisting of 24 shows in a row.

In September 2018, they toured with Alestorm through North America for the first time, playing 19 shows in the USA and Canada.

On 30 January 2019, the band's official Facebook page announced the album Legends from Beyond the Galactic Terrorvortex, which was released on 31 May 2019. The band released two singles, "Gloryhammer" on 12 April 2019 and "The Siege of Dunkeld (In Hoots We Trust)" on 10 May 2019, through the Napalm YouTube.

Following the album's release was the band's first North American tour as headliners in June with Æther Realm as support.

On 22 August 2021, Gloryhammer announced that Thomas Winkler had exited the band. Winkler addressed the situation, stating he was fired via an email that cited the band's reasons for his departure as disagreements on business and organizational matters.

In December 2021, Sozos Michael was introduced as the new singer of the band. They released their first single with Michael as lead singer, titled "Fly Away", on 28 April 2022. On 14 March 2023, the upcoming fourth studio album, Return to the Kingdom of Fife, was announced and is set to be released on 2 June 2023.

Controversy
Shortly after Gloryhammer announced that Winkler had been asked to leave the band, a former romantic partner of bassist James Cartwright alleged that Cartwright had abused her over a five-year period. More allegations were later released that in fact she was the abuser.  In addition, a Twitter account named "GloryhammerC" posted screenshots of what appeared to be an internal chat from 2017, between the members of the group that showed misogynist and racist behavior along with several racial slurs. Bassist Vincent Jackson Jones, who collaborated with Gloryhammer keyboardist Chris Bowes in the band Wizardthrone, released a statement on 26 August 2021 distancing himself professionally from Bowes and urging Bowes to make his own statement; at the time, none of Gloryhammer's members had made public comments on the issue. On 5 September 2021, Bowes and the rest of the band later released statements, admitting the leaked chat was true and apologizing for the racist and misogynist remarks. However they also stated that the claims regarding Cartwright and the alleged abuse were false.

Members

Current members
Christopher Bowes (Zargothrax) – keyboards, backing vocals (2010–present)
Ben Turk (Ralathor) – drums (2010–present)
Paul Templing (Ser Proletius) – guitars, backing vocals (2010–present)
James Cartwright (The Hootsman) – bass, backing vocals (2010–present)
Sozos Michael (Angus McFife) – lead vocals (2021–present)

Current touring members
 Michael Barber (Zargothrax)  – keyboards (2016–present)
Former members
 Gareth Murdock – guitars (2010) 
 Anthony Trimming – vocals (2010)
Thomas Winkler (Angus McFife XIII) – lead vocals (2011–2021)

Timeline

Discography
Studio albums
Tales from the Kingdom of Fife (2013)
Space 1992: Rise of the Chaos Wizards (2015)
Legends from Beyond the Galactic Terrorvortex (2019)
Return to the Kingdom of Fife (2023)

Tours 
 June 2013 - Netherlands show with Magnetron.
 September - October 2013 - "The Epic Tour of Furious Thunder" European tour with Darkest Era and Dendera.
 April - May 2014 - Australian Tour supported by Lagerstein.
 December 2014 - "The Unicorn Invasion of Europe" European tour with Shear and Twilight Force.
 October - November 2015 - "Eternal World Tour 2015" with Stratovarius and supported by Divine Ascension.
 May 2016 - "Beyond the Red Mirror Tour: Part II" supporting Blind Guardian.
 January - February 2017 - "Hammerfall: Built to Tour 2017" with Hammerfall and supported by Lancer.
 January 2018 - "European Tour MMXVII" European tour with Civil War and supported by Dendera.
 September 2018 - American tour supporting Alestorm.
 June 2019 - "North American Galactic Terrortour"  North American tour with Æther Realm.
 October 2019 - "Intergalactic Terrortour" UK tour with Beast in Black and supported by Wind Rose.
 November - December 2019 - "The Sacrament of Sin Tour 2019" with Powerwolf.
 January - February 2020 - "European Galactic Terrortour" European tour with Nekrogoblikon and Wind Rose.
 November - December 2021 - UK Tour with Alestorm, supported by Bootyard Bandits
 June 2022 - European tour supported by Warkings and Elvenking
 September 2022 - UK Tour supported by Brothers of Metal and Arion
 January - February 2023 - European tour with Alestorm and supported by Rumahoy and Wind Rose.

References

External links

 

Scottish power metal musical groups
Napalm Records artists
Bands with fictional stage personas